Oculoplastics,  or oculoplastic surgery, includes a wide variety of surgical procedures that deal with the orbit (eye socket), eyelids, tear ducts, and the face. It also deals with the reconstruction of the eye and associated structures.

Training
An oculoplastic surgeon is a specialized ophthalmologist who has completed one or two years of additional fellowship training following ophthalmology residency. Members of the American Society of Ophthalmic Plastic and Reconstructive Surgeons (ASOPRS) are the most highly qualified oculoplastic surgeons in North America. To qualify, a member must have passed both the American Board of Ophthalmology certification exams, as well as written and oral board examinations through ASOPRS. A candidate must also have made a significant contribution to the field of oculoplastics, which may take the form of a peer-reviewed publication.  Such other surgeons as plastic surgeons, otolaryngologists, and oral and maxillofacial surgeons may be trained in oculoplastic procedures as well.  The total additional training time for an ASOPRS Oculoplastic surgeon is 2 years after a 4-year Ophthalmology residency.

The most highly qualified oculoplastic surgeons in the United Kingdom are members of the British Oculoplastic Surgery Society (https://www.bopss.co.uk/).  In the UK oculoplastic surgeons will have generally undertaken 8–9 years of training, including 1–2 years of fellowship in addition to 7 years of registrar work (which typically includes 12–18 months of oculoplastic surgery training).

Oculoplastic procedures
Oculoplastic surgeons perform procedures such as the repair of droopy eyelids (blepharoplasty), repair of tear duct obstructions, orbital fracture repairs, removal of tumors in and around the eyes, eyelid and facial reconstruction.

Eyelid surgery
 Entropion, ectropion, ptosis, and eyelid tumors are commonly treated by various forms of eyelid surgery.
 Blepharoplasty (eyelift) is plastic surgery of the eyelids to remove excessive skin or subcutaneous fat.
 Asian blepharoplasty
 Ptosis repair for droopy eyelid.
 Ectropion repair
 Entropion repair
 Canthal resection
 A canthectomy is the surgical removal of tissue at the junction of the upper and lower eyelids.
 Cantholysis is the surgical division of the canthus.
 Canthopexy is the surgical fixation of the canthus.
 A canthoplasty is plastic surgery at the canthus.
 A canthorrhaphy is suturing of the outer canthus to shorten the palpebral fissure.
 A canthotomy is the surgical division of the canthus, usually the outer canthus.
 A lateral canthotomy is the surgical division of the outer canthus.
 Epicanthoplasty
 Tarsorrhaphy is a procedure in which the eyelids are partially sewn together to narrow the opening (i.e. palpebral fissure).
 Removal of eyelid tumors (such as basal cell carcinoma or squamous cell carcinoma)
 A Hughes procedure

Surgery involving the lacrimal apparatus
 External or Endoscopic Dacryocystorhinostomy (DCR) for nasolacrimal duct obstruction
 Canalicular trauma (canalicular laceration) repair
 Canaliculodacryocystostomy is a surgical correction for a congenitally blocked tear duct in which the closed segment is excised and the open end is joined to the lacrimal sac.
 Canaliculotomy involves slitting of the lacrimal punctum and canaliculus for the relief of epiphora
 A dacryoadenectomy is the surgical removal of a lacrimal gland.
 A dacryocystectomy is the surgical removal of a part of the lacrimal sac.
 A dacryocystorhinostomy (DCR) or dacryocystorhinotomy is a procedure to restore the flow of tears into the nose from the lacrimal sac when the nasolacrimal duct does not function.
 A dacryocystostomy is an incision into the lacrimal sac, usually to promote drainage.
 A dacryocystotomy is an incision into the lacrimal sac.

Eye removal
 An enucleation is the removal of the eye leaving the eye muscles and remaining orbital contents intact.
 An evisceration is the removal of the eye's contents, leaving the scleral shell intact. Usually performed to reduce pain in a blind eye.
 An exenteration is the removal of the entire orbital contents, including the eye, extraocular muscles, fat, and connective tissues; usually for malignant orbital tumors.

Orbital reconstruction
 Ocular prosthetics (artificial eyes)
 Orbital prosthesis (artificial replacement of the eye and eyelids within the discipline of Anaplastology) for an extenterated orbit.
 Orbital decompression for Graves' disease
 Orbital decompression for non-thyroid patients (aesthetic only)
 Orbital Tumor Removal - removing tumors around the eye that may compromise vision

Other
 Botox injections
 Injectable filler
 Browplasty

See also
 Eye surgery

References